Bruno Tognaccini (13 December 1932 – 13 August 2013) was an Italian racing cyclist. He won stage 11 of the 1956 Giro d'Italia.

References

External links
 

1932 births
2013 deaths
Italian male cyclists
Italian Giro d'Italia stage winners
Place of birth missing
Sportspeople from the Province of Arezzo
Cyclists from Tuscany